Events in the year 2009 in Eritrea.

Incumbents 

 President: Isaias Afewerki

Events 

 15 – 23 August – The country competed at the 2009 World Championships in Athletics in Berlin.

Deaths

References 

 
2000s in Eritrea
Years of the 21st century in Eritrea
Eritrea
Eritrea